Kalanithi Murasoli Maran is an Indian billionaire media mogul who is the chairman and founder of the Sun Group. He owns television channels, newspapers, weeklies, FM radio stations, DTH services, a cricket team (Sunrisers Hyderabad), and a movie production house. He also held a major share in the Indian airline Spice Jet from 2010 to 2015.

Career
In 1990, Maran started a monthly magazine in Tamil called Poomaalai. On 14 April 1993, he founded Sun TV. Sun TV was listed on the Bombay Stock Exchange on 24 April 2006 upon raising $133 million for 10% of the share capital, catapulting him into the billionaire charts. He was among the few representatives at a roundtable with the visiting then US President Bill Clinton. 
 
By 2010, he was the 17th richest Indian, with a net worth of US$4 Billion, and is the highest paid business executive in India. Maran and his wife, Kavery were ranked the highest paid  Business executives in the list of Indian executive pay charts with a package of  each.

He has won Young Businessman awards from CNBC and Ernst & Young, and Forbes magazine named him the "Television king of southern India". He has won Young Businessman awards from CNBC and Ernst & Young, and Forbes magazine named him the "Television king of southern India".

Personal life
Kalanithi Maran is the son of the former Union Minister of India Murasoli Maran and grand nephew of Former Tamil Nadu chief minister M. Karunanidhi. His younger brother Dayanidhi Maran was also a former minister. Kalanithi Maran married Kaveri, a native of Coorg and has a daughter named Kaviya Maran.  He had his schooling with Don Bosco, Egmore, Chennai. He graduated in commerce from Loyola College, Chennai. He did his MBA from University of Scranton.

References

External links

 Sun Group
 Forbes

Businesspeople from Chennai
Tamil billionaires
Living people
Indian television executives
Tamil businesspeople
Indian billionaires
University of Scranton alumni
1965 births
Loyola College, Chennai alumni
Don Bosco schools alumni
University of Madras alumni
Tamil entrepreneurs
Sun Group
Indian Premier League franchise owners